The 2012 Breeders' Cup Challenge series provided winners of the designated races with an automatic "Win and You're In" Berth in the 2012 Breeders' Cup. Races were chosen by the Breeders' Cup organization and included key prep races in the various Breeders' Cup divisions from around the world.

For 2012, the series consisted of 73 races in 10 countries, 52 of which were Grade / Group One events. Thirteen races were added to the series: the (South African) Queen’s Plate, Gran Premio 25 de Mayo, Stephen Foster Handicap, Personal Ensign, Grosser Preis von Baden, Gallant Bloom, Pilgrim, Miss Grillo, Bourbon, Royal Lodge, Middle Park, Beresford, and the Prix de la Foret.

Forty-five horses entered in the 2012 Breeders' Cup races qualified via the challenge series, including seven of the winners. These were:
 Fort Larned, who qualified for the Classic by winning the Whitney
 Royal Delta, who won both the Delaware Handicap and Beldame to qualify for the Ladies' Classic
 Little Mike, who qualified for the Turf by winning the Arlington Million
 Wise Dan, who won both the Woodbine Mile and Shadwell Turf Mile to quality for the Breeders' Cup Mile
 Groupie Doll, who qualified for the Filly & Mare Sprint by winning the Thoroughbred Club of America Stakes
 Shanghai Bobby, who earned his berth in the Juvenile by winning both the Hopeful and Champagne
 Calidoscopio, who qualified for the Marathon by winning the Clasico Belgrano

The winners of the 2012 Breeders' Cup Challenge series races are shown below. The last column shows whether the horse was subsequently entered in the Breeders' Cup, and if so, whether they achieved a top three finish.

References

Breeders' Cup Challenge
Breeders' Cup Challenge series
Breeders' Cup